Schongau may refer to:

Schongau, Bavaria, a town in Germany
Schongau, Lucerne, a commune in Switzerland